Viscount  was a Japanese statesman of the Meiji period.

Early life 
Fukuoka was born in Tosa District in present-day Kōchi Prefecture, and served the Yamauchi daimyō of Tosa as a domain official. Together with fellow Tosa samurai Gotō Shōjirō, he went to Kyoto in 1867 to convince shōgun Tokugawa Yoshinobu to return power peacefully to the Emperor, thus bringing about the Meiji Restoration.

Meiji statesman 
After the Meiji Restoration, while serving as a San'yo (senior councillor), he helped draft the text of the Charter Oath which set the tone and direction for the new Meiji government. In the new government, he concurrently served in a variety of offices, including Political system Affairs Officer and Parliament System Examination Officer. It was in this capacity that he was afterwards, asked to help draft the Seitaisho, which set up the organizational structure of the early Meiji government.

In 1870, Fukuoka was transferred back to Kōchi and focused on the reforms of domain's administration, just prior to the abolition of the han system.

In 1872, Fukuoka re-entered the central government as Taifu (Senior Vice Minister) of Education and of Justice, but resigned in 1873 due to his opposition to the government policy with regards to the Seikanron debate on the invasion of Korea

In 1880, Fukuoka returned to the government as a member of the Genrōin and later served as Minister of Education,  Sangi (Councillor), chairman of the Sanjiin (legislative advisory council).

He also served as Privy Councilor. In 1884, he was elevated to the rank of shishaku (viscount).

References 
 Beasley, William G.  The Rise of Modern Japan: Political, Economic and Social Change Since 1850. St. Martin's Press, New York 1995.
 Jansen, Marius B. and Gilbert Rozman, eds. (1986). Japan in Transition: from Tokugawa to Meiji. Princeton: Princeton University Press. ;  OCLC 12311985
 Keene, Donald. (2002). Emperor of Japan: Meiji and His World, 1852–1912. New York: Columbia University Press. ; OCLC 46731178
 Totten, George O. (1996). Democracy in Prewar Japan: Groundwork or Facade?. Boston: D.C. Heath and Company.

External links
National Diet Library biography & photo

1835 births
1919 deaths
Meiji Restoration
Samurai
People from Kōchi Prefecture
People from Tosa Domain
Kazoku
People of Meiji-period Japan
Education ministers of Japan
Ministers of Justice of Japan